The King's Quest Companion is a book by Peter Spear that serves as both hint book/walkthrough and contained complete novelization of each of the games in the King's Quest series by the original Sierra On-Line company. The first three editions were published by Silicon Valley Books, and fourth editions by McGraw Hill Osborne. The novelization for KQ6 was written by a guest writer, Eluki Bes Shahar.

Roberta Williams had some influence (though how much is unknown) and praised the books, as well as supplied to the author about the games stories.
"The King's Quest Companion is an interesting blend of fiction and helpful information for playing my games. Anyone interested in reading the story behind King's Quest or who just needs to be "unstuck" while playing the game will find this book invaluable."

Background
The first edition covered the first four games, and each new edition added the most recent game. The fourth and last edition covered up to the seventh game in the series.

The walkthrough novelizations are written from the point of view of various fictional narrators, such as Derek Karlavaegen, who also was used in manual for King's Quest 6, as well as other characters mentioned in the games or manuals. These characters serve to provide the hints in narrative form. The first two editions also included an encyclopedia, "An Encyclopedia of Daventry" giving expanded details on various subjects related to the games. The idea is that these articles (the "novels") were sent from another universe via a device called the "Eye Between the Worlds".

Description
In The King's Quest Companion, Spear claims that the World of Daventry exists in a different plane of reality. The creatures of magic and mythology withdrew to this other world to protect their existence as science and technology took over in our world.

Spear says he gets his information from Derek Karlavaegen, a scribe from the World of Daventry. After Karlavaegen interviewed Prince Alexander about his escape from the wizard Manannan, he traveled to Llewdor and took up shop in Manannan's house. It was here that he discovered "The Eye Between the Worlds", a device that allows him to communicate to other dimensions. It is through this that he has supposedly sent messages to Spear, including the story versions of King Graham and his family's adventures from the King's Quest games.

Spear even suggests that the Eye can be seen in the actual King's Quest III game, pointing out an object on the bookshelf in Manannan's study that looks like a computer screen.

Novelizations
King's Quest I written by an unnamed scribe of Daventry.
King's Quest II, written by prime minister Gerwain (from the KQ2 manual).
King's Quest III, written as an interview between Derek Karlavaegan and Alexander-Gwydion.
King's Quest IV, written by Queen Valanice.
King's Quest V, written by Derek Karlavaegan transcribing King Graham's account.
King's Quest VI, written by Derek Karlavaegan transcribing Alexander's account.
King's Quest VII, written by an unknown author.

Other articles
Read Me First: Peter Spear discusses how the book is more than just a hint book. But a solution book, and a history book.
Introduction: Peter Spear discusses how he first learned about King's Quest, and how he first began receiving messages from Derek Karlavaegen. He discusses scientific theories concerning parallel dimensions, and how Daventry is one of the these 'pocket universes'. It also contains a few details about how he Roberta Williams, and how he came about publishing the book.
The Eye Between the Worlds: Derek discusses how he communicates between the worlds, and discusses the 'great dreamer' ("Roberta Williams"), and how she is influencing his world. 
The World of Daventry: Derek discusses the geography of the world of Daventry. This includes a world map and discusses how the world is constantly changing (there are three versions of the world map in the first three editions, which are used as evidence for his theory).
A Magical Primer: A treatise by Alexander of Daventry discussing magic in the world, and his experiences using the magic in The Sorcery of Old (the spell book in KQ3). Alexander reprinted documents called, "Fragments of the Sorcery of Old" by an unknown author, that discuss spells from the book. This section is actually a reprinting of all the KQ3 spells in the manual (including the page numbers) with additional backstory for each spell.
Grave Matters: Contains, the article, "Ten Days in Tamir" from the Telltale Traveler section in Bruce Banner, a newspaper from the town of Port Bruce in the land of Llewdor. It discusses travel in the land of Tamir, and the haunted mansion ('Whateley Manor'), and the graveyards. A large section is a transcription of all or most of the gravestones seen in KQ4.
Iconomancy: A Magic Without Words: Another treatise by Alexander of Daventry on magic. He discusses the magic of Iconamancy and his return journey to visit Mordack's Island to research "The Objurgation of Souls" (the spellbook his father used in KQ5).
From the Land of Green Isles: A confession and Apologia: An letter by Derek Karlavaegen confessing and apologing for hiding  and denying personal knowledge of the Land of the Green Isles in previous maps and material he sent over from the world of Daventry. He discusses more of how he ended up on the island, how he met the king and queen, and how he ultimately made it off the islands. This is somewhat of a companion to the Guidebook to the Land of the Green Isles that was included with KQ6. The second part of the chapter is "An Editor's Note", is a letter by Peter Spear discussing how he usually works with Roberta Williams when writing the chapters in the Companion. He also discusses how Derek began to contact others including eluki bes shahar and Jane Jensen. He discusses how eluki had given some of the communications from Derek (a transcript of the events of KQ6). He learns that Jane Jensen had received a copy of the Guidebook. Soon after he receives copies of both directly from Derek on his own computer (confirming the validity of the documents in his mind). He discusses that Jane Jensen had made the decision to include an edited copy of the guidebook with KQ6.
From the Eye Between the Worlds: The first part is an editorial by Peter Spears, discussing his difficulty in suspending his own disbelief, of the veracity of the documents he has been receiving. He discusses a more recent material he received from Derek concerning the events of KQ7. The second half is a letter by Derek discussing rumors of an impending marriage between Rosella and Edgar, and stories he has been hearing about the Valanice and Rosella's journey to the world of Eldritch. He wonders if the document written by an unknown author, is just tabloid material. He makes note that the Royal Family has not told him the story first hand, and he is somewhat skeptical on if its really true. But he believes if it is true, that another 'great dreamer' (like Roberta Williams) lives in his world dreaming about the other world's version of his world, then shaping his world with his own dreams.
The Easy Way Out: This section is split into several parts. It is primarily meant as a standard step by step solution guide for the KQ games. The first part is Peter Spear discussing the differences between 'reality' and the version of the world portrayed in the games, and more of his questions on the veracity of the messages he has received. He also includes his 12 Rules for Computer Games, and a copy of Graham's Rules for Adventuring. Each chapter relates to a separate game, beginning with an overview of the game, and how it relates to "stories" Derek Sent him, before going into step-by-step walkthrough. In the first two editions some of this section, the item/point lists was included in the chapter, "The Final Score".
An Encyclopedia of Daventry: A section in the first two editions, that includes a glossary and back stories for many topics within the world of Daventry. From abominable snowmen to zombies.

Sierra Involvement
The King's Quest Companion is an official guide created in part through the help and input by many Sierra employees, and as such referenced by some of the later material produced by Sierra.

Roberta Williams is acknowledge for being of help in writing the books. According to Peter Spear, he would call Roberta Williams in order to develop chapters for the book. If she wasn't around or was too busy, he would contact other colleagues working on the games including Jane Jensen. The books were officially endorsed by Roberta Williams and she believed it brought the games to life in an exciting new way. She said it added another fascinating dimension to the entire King's Quest experience. She felt it was a pleasure to read, and a must have for anyone wanting to explore the series in greater depth and detail. She provided Peter Spear with encouragement, support, and access to work in progress.

Ken Williams (the former owner of Sierra On-line) supported the book from day one. He and his brother John Willams were extremely helpful and supportive of the book through the years, and without their support the book might not have existed. Peter Spear worked directly with Jane Jensen while editing and writing material for KQ6 portions (the main novelization was written by the professional novelist eluki bes shahar), and he worked with Lorelei Shannon on the material published in the 4th Edition and King's Quest VII: Authorized Guide. Other people at Sierra that assisted with Peter Spear in developing the book through the years include Bill Davis, Dennis Jonathan, Kirk Green, Anita Greene, Liz Jacobs, Mark Seibert, Marc Hudgins, Jonk Meek, Dan Rogers, Jerry Bowerman, and Joe Escalle.

The author directly worked with designers and the game publisher to receive behind the scenes information, and influenced material in the games (About King's Quest I-V), the manuals and even other official Hint Books on occasion (see KQ6 and KQ7 hintbooks by Lorelei Shannon, KQ5 Manual (computer and NES versions), the Guidebook to the Land of the Green Isles, KQ6 itself, and King's Questions (a computer game), and other material in the King's Quest Collection (15th Anniversary Collector's Edition)) (The Royal Scribe). Sierra's Interaction Magazine, and King's Quest Collection reprinted portions of the book on occasion to advertise them, give background story to the King's Quest World, and give hints to players (Sierra Magazine, Autumn 1989, Interaction, Fall 1994). The former article was included in the Inside the Chest archive included in several editions of the King's Quest Collection.

Reception
The editors of Computer Gaming World reviewed the book and stated that "A final comment on the book itself must be that The King's Quest Companion is more than a hint book and more than a reference work, it is... well, a companion. We suggest that readers will get even more out of the fine adventure series if they play the games (or replay them) with this book beside them."

Reviews
Sierra News Magazine
Page 6
Zero

Sources

References

Bibliography
 Spear, Peter. The King's Quest Companion, 4th Edition (Covers Games I-VII). Mcgraw-Hill; 4th edition (July 1997). ISBN 007882401X  ISBN 978-0078824012

External links
Youtube review

Books about video games
King's Quest
Novels based on video games